Charlotte Townsend-Gault is an art historian, professor emeritus, author, and curator. Townsend-Gault’s research, teaching and scholarship concerns contemporary visual and material Native American and First Nations cultures, particularly those of the Pacific Northwest.

Education 
She has a bachelor of Arts degree from the University of Sussex. She also has a PhD in Social Anthropology from the University College London (1988).

Background 
Townsend-Gault developed early career experience as curator of the Mezzanine Gallery at the Nova Scotia College of Art and Design (NSCAD) between 1969 and 1973. She then left NSCAD to pursue her doctoral studies, subsequently joining the Department of Art History, Visual Art and Theory (AHVA) at the University of British Columbia (UBC) in the late 1980s.

Townsend-Gault is also an Associate faculty member (emeritus) with the Department of Anthropology at UBC, and an Honorary Professor in the Department of Anthropology at University College London.

Scholarship 
Townsend-Gault’s own writing and collaborative editorial projects are recognized as foundational reading for students and scholars working in the areas of museums studies, museum anthropology, and the art history of Indigenous arts of the Northwest Coast.

The 2013 anthology Native Art of the Northwest Coast: A History of Changing Ideas was co-edited by Townsend-Gault, Jennifer Kramer and Ki-Ke-In, and has been awarded three prizes:

 2015 Canada Prize in the Humanities (Federation for the Humanities and Social Sciences) 
 2015 Jeanne Clarke Award for Publication, Prince George Public Library
 Melva J. Dwyer Award, Art Libraries Society of North America.

Townsend-Gault’s writing has appeared in art history and anthropology journals, and she has participated as a reviewer in publications such as RACAR, Vanguard and C Magazine.

Selected publications

Books and exhibition catalogues 

 Charlotte Townsend-Gault, Jennifer Kramer and Ki-Ke-In. Native Art of the Northwest Coast: A History of Changing Ideas. Vancouver: UBC Press, 2013.
 Karen Duffek and Charlotte Townsend-Gault. Bill Reid and Beyond: Expanding on Modern Native Art.  Vancouver: Douglas & McIntyre, 2004.
 Townsend-Gault, Charlotte and James Luna. Rebecca Belmore: The Named and the Unnamed. Vancouver BC: Morris and Helen Belkin Art Gallery UBC, 2003. e-Artexte: https://e-artexte.ca/id/eprint/21312/ Belkin.
 Diana Nemiroff, Robert Houle, and Charlotte Townsend-Gault. Land, Spirit, Power: First Nations at the National Gallery of Canada. National Gallery of Canada, 1992.

Book chapters 

 “The Raven, the Eagle, the Sparrows, and Thomas Crow: Making Native Modernism on the Northwest Coast.” In Essays on Native Modernism: complexities and contradiction in American Indian art. (Washington, D.C.: National Museum of the American Indian, Smithsonian Institution, 2006).
 "Ways of Knowing" (revised), in The Anthropology of Art: a reader, edited by Howard Morphy and Morgan Perkins. (Malden, MA: Blackwell Pub., 2006). 
 “When the (Oven) Gloves Are Off: The Queen’s Baton – Doing What to Whom.” In Beyond Aesthetics: Art and the Technologies of Enchantment, edited by Nicholas Thomas and Christopher Pinney. (Oxford: Berg, 2001).
 “Conceptual Daze At NSCAD – The Mezzanine.” In Conceptual Art: The NSCAD Connection 1967-1973, edited and curated by Bruce Barber. Nova Scotia College of Art and Design. (Halifax, N.S.: Anna Leonowens Gallery, 2001).

Further reading 

 “'My World is Surreal,' or 'The Northwest Coast' is Surreal.” Journal of Surrealism and the Americas 7:1 (2013), 96-107. https://repository.asu.edu/items/18660
 “Outside things inside: relative status on the Northwest coast.” World Art 2, no. 1 (2012): 13-24, DOI: 10.1080/21500894.2012.662174
 "Not a Museum but a Cultural Journey: Skwxwú7mesh Political Affect." The Journal of the Royal Anthropological Institute 17, (2011): S39-S55. URL: https://www.jstor.org/stable/23011424
 “Sea-lion Whiskers and Spray-crete: the affect of Indigenous status in contemporary British Columbia.” Journal of Material Culture 16, no. 4 (2011): 416- 428. DOI: 10.1177/135918351142838.
 “World art: a boundary issue.” World Art 1, no. 1, (2011): 37-41. https://doi.org/10.1080/21500894.2011.521635
 “Rebecca Belmore and James Luna on location at Venice: the allegorical Indian redux.” Art History 29, no. 4, (September 2006): 721-755. doi:10.1111/j.1467-8365.2006.00521.x.
 "Circulating Aboriginality." Journal of Material Culture  9, no. 2 (2004): 183–202. https://doi.org/10.1177/1359183504044372
 "First Nations Culture: Who Knows What?" Canadian Journal of Communication 23, no. 1 (Winter, 1998): 31. DOI: https://doi.org/10.22230/cjc.1998v23n1a1021           
 "If Art is the Answer, what is the Question? some Queries Raised by First Nations' Visual Culture in Vancouver." RACAR 21, no. 1/2 (01/01/1994): 100. URL: https://www.jstor.org/stable/42631191  "Northwest Coast Art: The Culture of the Land Claims." American Indian Quarterly 18, no. 4 (1994): 445-67. doi:10.2307/1185391.
 “Symbolic Facades: Official Portraits in British Institutions since 1920.” Art History 11, no. 4 (December 1988): 511. doi:10.1111/j.1467-8365.1988.tb00321.x.

References 

Living people
Year of birth missing (living people)
Canadian art historians
Women art historians
Alumni of the University of Sussex
Alumni of University College London
Academic staff of the University of British Columbia
Academics of University College London
20th-century Canadian historians
20th-century Canadian women writers
21st-century Canadian historians
21st-century Canadian women writers
Canadian women historians